Hugo Fernández Faingold (born 1 March 1947) is a Uruguayan political figure, who served as Vice President of Uruguay.

Background

Fernández Faingold belongs to the Uruguayan Colorado Party. He is son of historian and Colorado Party (Uruguay) trade unionist Hugo Fernández Artucio and Julia Faingold.

He was married with Ana Maria Renna Valdez, and they  have 6 children, he divorced in 2003. After he married with Veronica Cortavarria they have 2 children. Currently, He is married to Analia Barrientos.

Political career

During the first presidency of Julio Maria Sanguinetti he served as Ministry of Labour and Social Welfare.  He later served as Vice President of Uruguay from 1998–2000, in the second Administration of President Julio Maria Sanguinetti, succeeding Hugo Batalla, who died in office.

Historical note

Fernández was the twelfth person to hold the office of Vice President of Uruguay. The office dates from 1934, when Alfredo Navarro became Uruguay's first Vice President.

Subsequent events

Fernández Faingold was himself succeeded as Vice President by Luis Antonio Hierro López in 2000.

He subsequently served as Uruguayan Ambassador to the United States from 2000 to 2005.

See also
 Politics of Uruguay
 List of political families#Uruguay

References

Living people
Vice presidents of Uruguay
Presidents of the Senate of Uruguay
Candidates for President of Uruguay
Uruguayan Jews
Jewish Uruguayan politicians
Ministers of Labor and Social Affairs of Uruguay
Politicians from Montevideo
Ambassadors of Uruguay to the United States
Place of birth missing (living people)
Colorado Party (Uruguay) politicians
1947 births